Fish tofu is a fish product that resembles the form and texture of tofu. It is made from fish paste (also known as surimi).

History
According to legend, fish tofu was invented by Shi Lang (1621–1696) in Tainan, present-day Taiwan. He was a naval officer of the ruler Zheng Jing. Shi first popularised fish tofu with soldiers, the legend goes.

See also 

 Fishcake

References 

Fish dishes
Surimi